The EHF Women's Champions League 2010–11 is the 18th edition of the EHF Women's Champions League, a handball competition for top women's clubs of Europe managed by the European Handball Federation.

Larvik HK won the title for the first time after defeating SD Itxako 47–46 on aggregate in the final.

Participants 
  Hypo Niederösterreich
  HC Podravka Vegeta
  Viborg HK
  Itxako Reyno de Navarra
  Toulon St-Cyr Var Handball
  HC Leipzig
  Győri Audi ETO KC
  ŽRK Budućnost Podgorica
  Larvik HK
  CS Oltchim Râmnicu Vâlcea
  Dinamo Volgograd
  RK Krim Ljubljana
  Randers HK
  Zvezda Zvenigorod
  IK Sävehof
  DVSC - Korvex

Qualifying rounds 
The draw for both tournaments took place on 13 July 2010 in Vienna. The rights to organize and host the group matches were also decided in this draw.

Qualification tournament 1 
The qualification tournament 1 was hosted by IK Sävehof in Gothenburg, Sweden. IK Sävehof and T+A/VOC Amsterdam advanced to the second Qualification Tournament. Gil Eanes/Lagos and LK ZUG Handball entered the EHF Cup at Round 2.

Qualification tournament 2 
Sixteen teams were divided into four groups of four teams each. Twelve losers of the qualification tournament 2 entered the EHF Cup at Round 3. The first placed team of each group advanced to the Group Matches.

Group 1 
Hosted by Randers HK in Randers, Denmark.All times are local

Group 2 
Hosted by A.C. Ormi-Loux Patras in Patras, Greece.All times are local

Group 3 
Hosted by ŽRK Metalurg Skopje in Skopje, Macedonia.All times are local

Group 4 
Hosted by SPR Lublin SSA in Lublin & Chelm, Poland.All times are local

Group matches 
Twelve teams, along with four winners of the qualifying rounds, are competing in the group matches of the Champions League. There are four groups of four teams each. The first and second placed team of each group advances to the main round. Third placed teams will enter the Cup Winners' Cup in Round 4.

The draw for the round took place in Vienna on 13 July 2010 as part of a special event organized by the EHF, the Champions' Draw.

Group 1 

All times are local

Group 2 

All times are local

Group 3 

All times are local

Group 4

Main round
The draw took place at 23 November 2010 in Vienna. Each group will consist of two group winners and two runners-up, although teams that faced each other in the Group Matches could not be drawn into the same group.

Group 1

Group 2

Semifinals
The semifinals were held on 9 April and 17 April 2011. The winner of each main round group played the second match at home.

|}

First match

Second match

Final

|}

First match

Second match

Top scorers 

Source

References

External links

 
Women's EHF Champions League
EHF
EHF